Pascale Mormiche (born 1961) is a French historian. She studies the education of French elites in the 17th and 18th centuries.

Biography 
Pascale Mormiche has a History degree. In 2005, she defended her thesis The Education of French Princes from Louis XIII to Louis XVI, in Modern History, at the University of Versailles-Saint-Quentin-en-Yvelines. Her thesis was published in 2009. She collaborates with the Center de recherche du château de Versailles. She teaches at the Cergy-Pontoise University.

In 2018, she published Le petit Louis XV. Childhood of a prince, genesis of a king (1704-1725). This study attempts to reconsider the childhood of Louis XV.

In 2022, she published Bringing the Kingdom to Life. In this research work, she studies 150 princely pregnancies at the court of France. The pregnancies of princesses and queens are a central concern in the princely courts. Women's bodies are a matter of state.

Works 

 Devenir prince : l'école du pouvoir en France, XVIIe-XVIIIe siècles, Paris, CNRS, 2013, 645 p.
 Le petit Louis XV : enfance d'un prince, genèse d'un roi, 1704-1725,  Ceyzérieu, Champ Vallon, 2018, 421 p.()
 Donner vie au royaume : grossesses et maternités à la cour, XVIIe-XVIIIe siècle,  Paris, CNRS, 2022, 503 p.

References 

Living people
1961 births
French historians
French women historians
Women in history
French women
French women academics